Adrien Tesson (born 9 May 1997) is a French figure skater. He is the 2018 International Challenge Cup champion, 2017 Ice Challenge bronze medalist, 2014 NRW Trophy bronze medalist, and 2019 French national bronze medalist.

Career 
Tesson was born in Cherbourg-en-Cotentin, France. He studied at Paris-Est Créteil University.

Career 
Tesson began learning to skate in 2005. He competed internationally in the novice ranks during the 2010–11 season and moved up to juniors the following season. His ISU Junior Grand Prix (JGP) debut came in September 2013. He would compete at a total of four JGP events, achieving his best result (6th) at JGP France in August 2014.

Making his senior international debut, Tesson won bronze at the NRW Trophy in November 2014.

He finished 17th at the 2017 Winter Universiade in February in Almaty, Kazakhstan. He won bronze at the Ice Challenge in November 2017 and gold at the International Challenge Cup in February 2018.

During an exhibition gala in early August 2018, Tesson cut an artery in his wrist with his skate blade when he fell on a jump. In December, he won bronze at the French Championships. In March, he placed 10th at the 2019 Winter Universiade in Krasnoyarsk, Russia.

Programs

Competitive highlights 
GP: Grand Prix; CS: Challenger Series; JGP: Junior Grand Prix

References

External links 
 

1997 births
French male single skaters
Living people
People from Cherbourg-Octeville
Competitors at the 2017 Winter Universiade
Competitors at the 2019 Winter Universiade
Sportspeople from Manche